Gumapang Ka sa Lusak (International title: Secret Affairs / ) is a 2010 Philippine television drama series broadcast by GMA Network. Based on a 1990 Philippine film of the same title, the series is the nineteenth instalment of Sine Novela. Directed by Maryo J. de los Reyes, it stars Dennis Trillo and Jennylyn Mercado. It premiered on February 8, 2010 on the network's Dramarama sa Hapon line up replacing Kaya Kong Abutin ang Langit. The series concluded on June 18, 2010 with a total of 93 episodes. It was replaced by Trudis Liit in its timeslot.

Cast and characters

Lead cast
 Dennis Trillo as Levi
 Jennylyn Mercado as Rachel Mantaring

Supporting cast
 Al Tantay as Edmundo Guatlo
 Sandy Andolong as Rowena Tuazon-Guatlo
 Glydel Mercado as Anita Ramiro
 Julio Diaz as Mateo Mantaring
 Lotlot De Leon as Linda Mantaring
 Ronnie Lazaro as Falcon
 Rocco Nacino as RJ Guatlo
 Ryza Cenon as Apple Madrigal
 Martin Escudero as Jonathan Guatlo
 Prince Stefan as Dodo Gaspar III
 Vaness del Moral as Gina Mantaring
 Shawn Rodriguez as Boni
 Luz Valdez as Isang
 Michael Sandico as Ricardo Guatlo
 Jolly Molly as Andrea
 Jamilla Obispo as Joana
 Patricia Ismael as Beauty

Guest cast
Myra Ocampo as Clarissa
Enzo Pineda as Elmer
Sarah Lahbati as Mika
Gail Lardizabal as a mayor

Ratings
According to AGB Nielsen Philippines' Mega Manila household television ratings, the pilot episode of Gumapang Ka sa Lusak earned a 17.1% rating. While the final episode scored a 5.6% rating in Mega Manila People/Individual television ratings.

References

External links
 

2010 Philippine television series debuts
2010 Philippine television series endings
Filipino-language television shows
GMA Network drama series
Live action television shows based on films
Philippine romance television series
Television shows set in the Philippines